Adam Bloom (born 8 December 1970) is a British comedian and writer. He has played The Edinburgh Festival for many years, once winning The Edinburgh Festival Polygram Punter Comedy Award. In 1998 he won The Time Out Comedy Award for Best Stand-Up. He appeared at The Melbourne International Comedy Festival 1999 and 2000, winning a Stella Artois award for the former appearance.

Radio and television appearances
Bloom was a guest on RMITV's The Loft Live Episode 12 of Season 8 13 April 2000 broadcast on Channel 31 Melbourne.

He has also appeared on Mock the Week, "Never Mind The Buzzcocks", Russell Howard's Good News and The Young Person's Guide To Becoming a Rockstar.

Bloom wrote and starred in the BBC Radio 4 show The Problem with Adam Bloom which ran for three series (2003–2005).

In 1999 Channel 4 commissioned 'Beyond a Joke', Bloom's own half-hour special, a mockumentary about a comedian's life off-stage.

Notable works
MP3 Recording
 Stand Up Great Britain
 Adam Bloom Live

Adam performed at the ‘Just For Laughs’ comedy festival in Montreal in 1998, 2001, 2005 & 2013, recording TV galas in 2001 & 2005 which were broadcast in several counties around The World.  He was also part of the ‘2004 Just Laughs Tour’ performing to 42,000 people in 17 cities across Canada.

In 2011 Adam provided additional material for The Antics Roadshow, a 48-minute TV documentary directed by Banksy.

On 11 September 2015 he performed at the comedy stage at Banksy's Dismaland, the art exhibition in Weston-Super-Mare.

In November 2019 he was asked to be the sole judge of Banksy's 'Gross Domestic Product' competition where Adam got to choose which of hundreds of thousands of entrants from over 200 countries won the chance to buy original Banksy art at affordable prices ranging from signed spray cans to the bullet-proof vest worn by Stormzy at Glastonbury Festival.

References

External links

Living people
English male comedians
1970 births
20th-century English comedians
21st-century English comedians
People from the London Borough of Richmond upon Thames